= Parada National High School =

Public high school in Valenzuela, Philippines

- Mataas na Paaralang Pambansa ng Parada (Filipino)
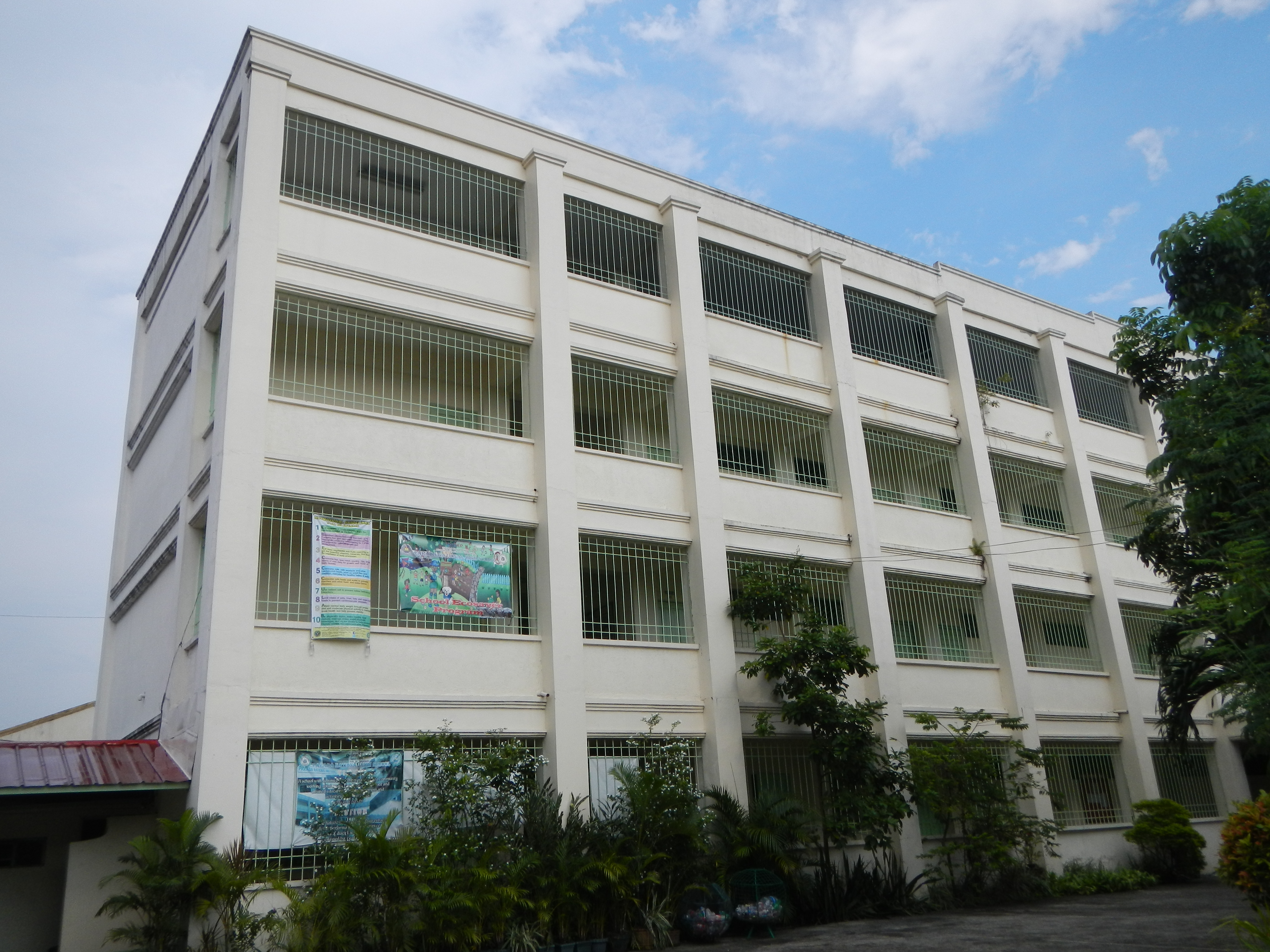
- PNHS, New Building

Location
- S. de Guzman Street, Parada, Valenzuela City; Valenzuela City, Metro Manila; Philippines
- Coordinates: 14°41′44″N 120°59′25″E

Information
- Type: Public
- Founded: 1968
- School district: Division of City Schools - Valenzuela
- Principal: Edelina I. Golloso
- Grades: 7 to 12
- Campus type: Urban

Parada National High School is a public high school located at S. de Guzman St., Parada, Valenzuela City in the Philippines. It currently has two separate buildings (separated by a road), informally known as the old and new buildings.
